The Yagua  language is spoken primarily in northeastern Peru by the Yagua people. As of 2005, it appears that a few speakers may have migrated across the Peruvian-Colombian border near the town of Leticia. A third of the population is monolingual, and Yagua is the language of instruction in local primary schools.

Name
The exonym is spelled Yagua, Yawa, Yahua, Llagua, Yava, Yegua. They also go by Nijyamïï Nikyejaada.

Genetic affiliation 
The Yagua language is a branch of the Peba–Yaguan language family.

Sociolinguistic situation 
By the end of the 20th century, there were about 6,000 speakers of the language.  At that time, a majority of Yagua individuals were bilingual in both Spanish and the Yagua language.  A few distant communities were still largely monolingual, and children were learning the language, though in at least some communities there was parental pressure on children to just speak Spanish.  Some ethnic Yaguas are monolingual in Spanish.

There is some degree of semilingualism among certain Yagua women who are culturally assimilated into mainstream Peruvian culture, not having native-like command of either Spanish or Yagua. They contrast with three other groups of Yagua: 1) older women who are fluent Yagua speakers with some degree of Spanish, 2) unassimilated monolingual Yaguas, and 3) men, who all speak Yagua with varying degrees of Spanish fluency. These young women are primarily addressed in Yagua, but respond in a simplified Spanish.

Phonology 
Yagua has 6 vowels and 11 consonants, as shown in the chart below. (Orthographic symbols in bold, IPA values in square brackets.)

Vowels 

 Vowels are both oral and nasal.

Consonants 

 A nasal consonant preceding a nasal vowel is a simple nasal sound ( [m], [n]); but a nasal consonant preceding an oral vowel has an oral release ([mb], [nd])
 All phones except for /s/, /tʃ/, and /j/ may be palatalized.  In addition, bilabial stops may be labialized. /t, n, s/ when palatalized are heard as [tʲ, ɲ, ʃ].
 /s/ and /tʃ/ show significant allophonic variation, being either pre-stopped or not.  Thus /s/ ranges from [s] to [ts], and /tʃ/ ranges from [tʃ] to [ʃ].
 The rhotic r is often retroflex and may have some laterality; simple taps are also heard. /r/ can also be realized as [d], especially when palatalized.
 /w/ can be realized as [β], especially when palatalized.
 Within a word, there is metathesis of any morpheme-final /j/ with the onset of the following syllable

The language has either tone or a complex pitch-accent system, but this has never been adequately described.

Morphology 
The language is highly agglutinative, such that most words consist of multiple morphemes, and a single word may contain more than one root.

Syntax 
Most Yagua sentences begin with the verb, followed by the subject and object in that order (VSO).  It is a "double object" language, with no known syntactic differences between the two objects of verbs like 'give', for example, or applied objects.

The language has numerous postpositions (and no prepositions, which is generally unexpected for VSO languages).  There are over 40 noun classifiers, and essentially no "adjectives".  Nouns are modified either by nouns, by classifiers, or by other suffixes.

Yagua uses adjective-like nouns as adjectives. The problem then occurs in a sentence like the red hen, which would be more like "the red one, the hen". Both "the red one" and "the hen" could be the head of the noun phrase. This is solved by determining which of the two nouns persists in the following discourse. If "the red one" persists, then "red" is the head; if "the hen" persists, then "hen" is the head. The order of elements is sensitive to determining the head.

The language is documented in various works by Paul Powlison, Esther Powlison, Doris L. Payne, and Thomas E. Payne.

Vocabulary 
Yagua has a quinary (base 5) counting system.  Different numbers are used for inanimate objects/counting and animate objects (see measure word).

Bibliography
Payne, Doris L. 1985. Aspects of the Grammar of Yagua: A Typological Perspective (Peru). University of California at Los Angeles.
Payne, Doris L.  1986.  Basic word order in Yagua.  Handbook of Amazonian Languages 1, ed. by Desmond Derbyshire and Geoffrey Pullum.  Berlin:  Mouton.
Payne, Doris L.  forthcoming.  Source of the Yagua classifier system.
Payne, Thomas E.  1994. The Twins Stories: Participant Coding in Yagua Narrative.  Berkeley:  University of California Press.
Powlison, Paul and Esther Powlison.  1958.  "El sistema numérico del yagua."

References

External links
Yagua language dictionary online from IDS (select simple or advanced browsing)
Yagua (Intercontinental Dictionary Series)

Agglutinative languages
Peba–Yaguan languages
Languages of Peru
Languages of Colombia